Dina is a feminine given name.

Dina may also refer to:

Places 
 Dina, Alberta, a locality in Canada
 Dina, Pakistan, a town in the Punjab
 Dina Tehsil, the district surrounding the town
 Dina, a village in India where Guru Gobind Singh wrote the letter Zafarnamah
 Dina river, Maharashtra, India

People 
 Dina (surname), a list of people
 Dina (belly dancer), Egyptian belly dancer Dina Tala'at (born 1964)
 Dina (musician), stage name of Norwegian pop musician Caroline Kongerud (born 1985)
 Dina (singer), Portuguese singer and songwriter born Ondina Maria Farias Veloso in 1956

Arts and entertainment 
 Dina (film), a 2017 American documentary film directed by Antonio Santini and Dan Sickles
 Dina, a genie in the 2002–2004 Spanish sitcom ¡Ala... Dina!
 Dina, the protagonist of the 2002 Norwegian film I Am Dina
 Dina (video game console), released in 1986

Other uses 
 Dirección de Inteligencia Nacional (DINA), the Chilean secret police under the Pinochet regime
 Cyclone Dina, a 2002 cyclone
 Dina (leech), a genus of leeches in the family Erpobdellidae
 DINA S.A., a Mexican truck and bus manufacturer
 MFK Dina Moskva, a Russian futsal club based in Moscow

See also 
 Dyna
 Dena (disambiguation)
 Dima (disambiguation)
 Dinah (disambiguation)
 Dinas (disambiguation)
 Dinar (disambiguation)
 Dynas
 Dynax
 Dynix
 Din (disambiguation)